Kimrey-Haworth House is a historic home located at Greensboro, Guilford County, North Carolina. It was built about 1925, and is a two-story, five bay by three bay, frame dwelling in the Renaissance Revival style faced with brick.  It has a hipped roof covered by rounded Spanish-style red tiles, a brick chimney, and deep overhanging eaves.  The front facade features a one-story wooden segmental arched portico supported by wooden Doric order columns.  Also on the property is a contributing complementary garage.

It was listed on the National Register of Historic Places in 1991.

References

Houses on the National Register of Historic Places in North Carolina
Renaissance Revival architecture in North Carolina
Houses completed in 1925
Houses in Greensboro, North Carolina
National Register of Historic Places in Guilford County, North Carolina